SCNR may refer to:

 Fundo Naicura Airport (ICAO code: SCNR)
 Supreme Council for National Reconstruction, a military junta in South Korea in the 1960s
 The Youtube Channel and News network operated by Tim Pool